Soheil Asgharzad Fayyaz (born 13 January 1993 in Anzali, Iran) is an Iranian football midfielder, who currently plays for Esteghlal in Iran's Premier League football.

References

External links
 Soheil Asgharzad at Persian League

Living people
1993 births
Iranian footballers
Malavan players
Gahar Zagros players
Esteghlal F.C. players
People from Bandar-e Anzali
Association football midfielders
Sportspeople from Gilan province